The list of University of Arkansas Alumni includes distinguished alumni, faculty, and leaders of the University of Arkansas.

Alumni

Arts, entertainment and letters

Business, science and academia

Sports

Olympians

Politics, law and military

Faculty

University presidents
Up until 1982, the president was the chief administrative officer of the Fayetteville campus. After 1982, the position of chancellor was created to be the top administrator at the Fayetteville campus, and the title of president referred to the University of Arkansas System.

*Martin continued to serve as President of the University of Arkansas System after 1982.

University chancellors
Up until 1982, the president was the chief administrative officer of the Fayetteville campus. After 1982, the position of chancellor was created to be the top administrator at the Fayetteville campus.

References

University of Arkansas people